Prakash V. G., professionally credited as Vettukili Prakash, is an Indian actor who appears in Malayalam films. He acts in supporting roles.

Career
Prakash born in 1966, hails from Ayyanthole in Thrissur, India. He took graduation in stage acting from School of Drama, Thrissur. He made his acting debut in 1987 with the Malayalam film Theertham. He received his stage name after his character "Vettukili" in the film Ennodu Ishtam Koodamo. He was active in the 1990s, typecasted in supporting comedy roles. In 2017, he appeared in Thondimuthalum Driksakshiyum in a serious role, which helped to break his typecasting.

Filmography

References

External links 
 

Indian male film actors
Male actors in Malayalam cinema
21st-century Indian male actors
20th-century Indian male actors
1966 births
Living people